Shlomi Bracha (born March 21, 1962) is an Israeli Rock musician and record producer, best known for being the guitarist and one of the songwriters in the Israeli rock band Mashina.

Biography
Bracha was born March 21, 1962, in Kiryat Shalom, Tel Aviv, Israel. He met Yuval Banay in 1980 while they were serving together in the Israel Defense Forces, and they formed a band. They split up after their army service, and Bracha formed the group HaChazit Ha'amamit ("The National Front") with bassist Michael Benson. In 1984 Bracha teamed up again with Banay and with drummer Iggy Dayan to form the band Mashina. Their self-titled debut album was released in 1985. Later Avner Hodorov joined the band on keyboard and saxophone.

In May 1995 the group disbanded after a series of four farewell shows. Bracha began co-writing with Rami Fortis, and they released an album a few years later. He released a solo album, Chaplin Charlie, in 2003, the same year that Mashina got back together and resumed recording and performing.

Aside from his musical career, Shlomi Bracha served as coach and mentor (alongside his teammate, Yuval Banay) on the television show The Voice Israel in the second season.

Discography
 "Ratz Al Ha'Ketza" (Running on the Edge) with Rami Fortis (1998)
 "Chaplin Charlie" (2003)
 For Mashina's complete discography see Mashina

External links
 
 Lyrics to Shlomi Bracha's songs

1962 births
Living people
Jewish Israeli musicians
20th-century Israeli male musicians
21st-century Israeli male musicians
Israeli male songwriters
Israeli entertainers
Israeli rock musicians
Pop rock musicians
Alternative rock musicians
New wave musicians
Ska musicians